Sonya Teresa Smith is an American mechanical engineer whose research involves computational fluid dynamics and thermal management of electronics for air and space vehicles. She is a professor at Howard University, the director of the atmospheric sciences program at Howard University, and the 2020–2021 president of Sigma Xi.

Education and career
Smith is the daughter of mathematician Emma B. Smith and historian James W. Smith, both professors at Virginia State University; she is a graduate of Matoaca High School in Virginia. She majored in mathematics at Valdosta State University, with an emphasis in computer science, and graduated with a B.S. in 1986. After working as a programmer and engineer at NASA's Langley Research Center from 1986 to 1989, she returned to graduate study in mechanical and aerospace engineering at the University of Virginia, where she earned a master's degree in 1991 and completed her Ph.D. in 1995, as the first African-American woman in that program. Her dissertation, The Nonlinear Interaction of Goertler Vortices and Tollmien-Schlichting Waves in Compressible Boundary Layers, was supervised by Hossein Haj-Hariri.

She joined Howard University as an assistant professor in 1995, and was promoted to associate professor in 2001 and full professor in 2010. She served as chair of mechanical engineering from 2011 to 2015. She was the first woman in mechanical engineering to earn tenure at Howard University, the first to become a full professor, and the first to become department chair.

Recognition
Smith was elected as president of Sigma Xi, an honor society for American scientists and engineers, for the 2020–2021 term. In 2021, Smith was named to the American Academy of Arts and Sciences. She is also a Fellow of the American Society of Mechanical Engineers.

References

Year of birth missing (living people)
Living people
American mechanical engineers
African-American women engineers
American women engineers
African-American engineers
Valdosta State University alumni
University of Virginia School of Engineering and Applied Science alumni
Howard University faculty
Fellows of the American Academy of Arts and Sciences
Fellows of the American Society of Mechanical Engineers
American women academics
21st-century African-American people
21st-century African-American women